Dominik Štumberger (born 17 April 1999) is a professional footballer who plays as a midfielder for WSG Tirol. Born in Austria, he has most recently represented Croatia at youth level.

Club career
On 14 July 2021, he signed with WSG Tirol.

References

External links
 
Dominik Stumberger at ÖFB

1999 births
Living people
Footballers from Graz
Austrian people of Croatian descent
Association football midfielders
Austrian footballers
Austria youth international footballers
Croatian footballers
Croatia youth international footballers
FC Liefering players
SC Austria Lustenau players
WSG Tirol players
2. Liga (Austria) players
Austrian Regionalliga players
Austrian Football Bundesliga players